Biogenesis of lysosome-related organelles complex 1 subunit 2 is a protein that in humans is encoded by the BLOC1S2 gene.

Interactions
BLOC1S2 has been shown to interact with BLOC1S1, SNAPAP, MUTED, CNO and PLDN.

References

External links

Further reading